Free movement may refer to:

Freedom of movement between states
The Free Movement, an R&B group